Tsoilitsoili is a community council located in the Leribe District of Lesotho. Its population in 2006 was 18,456.

Villages
The community of Tsoili-tsoili includes the villages of Ha 'Nena (Kolonyama), Ha 'Noko, Ha Botsane, Ha Jobo, Ha Leboea, Ha Lepapa, Ha Lintša, Ha Makhaketsa, Ha Makhula, (Kronstaad)Ha Manama, Ha Maphomane (Manganeng), Ha Masimole, Ha Matala, Ha Mofeli, Ha Mohai, Ha Mohlokaqala, Ha Mokati, Ha Molelle, Ha Molipa, Ha Moqathinyane, Ha Moramang, Ha Motlokoa, Ha Nkhabu, Ha Ntseke, Ha Ntsekele, Ha Polile, Ha Polisa, Ha Rafelile (Manganeng), Ha Rakobeli, Ha Rakolo, Ha Ralehlatsa, Ha Rampa (Manganeng), Ha Ratšita, Ha Senyeke, Ha Setšabi, Ha Thokoa, Ha Tlalinyane, Ha Tokoto, Ha Tumo, Likatseng, Makhalong and Sekhutlong.

Education
The Little Flower Primary School in the village of Kolonyama serves 340 children while the nursery school serves 15. Children are taught psychologically, spiritually, academically and socially.

Health Care
The Little Flower Health Centre in the village of Kolonyama provides outpatient, well baby clinic, home and school visits, village health workers and even an occasional delivery of a newborn.

References

External links
 Google map of community villages

Populated places in Leribe District